Hexadikothrips is a genus of thrips in the family Phlaeothripidae.

Species
 Hexadikothrips dalbyi

References

Phlaeothripidae
Thrips
Thrips genera